Trial Without Jury is a 1950 American mystery film directed by Philip Ford and starring Robert Rockwell, Barbra Fuller and Kent Taylor.

The film's sets were designed by the art director Frank Hotaling.

Partial cast

References

Bibliography
 Pierce, David. Motion Picture Copyrights & Renewals, 1950-1959. Milestone, 1989.

External links
 

1950 films
1950s mystery films
American mystery films
Films directed by Philip Ford
Republic Pictures films
American black-and-white films
1950s English-language films
1950s American films